The UK Rock & Metal Singles Chart is a record chart which ranks the best-selling rock and heavy metal songs in the United Kingdom. Compiled and published by the Official Charts Company, the data is based on each track's weekly physical sales, digital downloads and streams. In 2005, there were 21 singles that topped the 52 published charts. The first number-one single of the year was "Boulevard of Broken Dreams" by American pop punk band Green Day, which spent the first two weeks of the year atop the chart at the end of a five-week run beginning in December 2004. The final number-one single of the year was "One Way Ticket", the lead single from One Way Ticket to Hell... and Back, the second album by The Darkness, which spent the last six weeks of the 2005 (and the first four of 2005) at number one.

The most successful song on the UK Rock & Metal Singles Chart in 2005 was "Wake Me Up When September Ends" by Green Day, which spent eight weeks at number one. "Boulevard of Broken Dreams" also spent seven weeks at number one, while "Holiday" was number one for four weeks. "Somewhere Else" by Razorlight spent five weeks and "One Way Ticket" by The Darkness spent six weeks at number one, Iron Maiden spent four weeks at number one with "The Number of the Beast" and "The Trooper", and Foo Fighters spent three weeks at number one with "Best of You" (two weeks) and "DOA" (one week). Rammstein topped the chart with "Keine Lust" and "Benzin", Nine Inch Nails topped the chart with "The Hand That Feeds" and "Only", My Chemical Romance topped the chart with "Helena" and "The Ghost of You" and songs by HIM, Nickelback and Nine Black Alps all spent two weeks atop the chart.

Chart history

See also
 2005 in British music
 List of UK Rock & Metal Albums Chart number ones of 2005

References

External links
 Official UK Rock & Metal Singles Chart Top 40 at the Official Charts Company
 The Official UK Top 40 Rock Singles at BBC Radio 1

2005 in British music
United Kingdom Rock and Metal Singles
2005